The Forest City Velodrome is an indoor cycling facility in London, Ontario, Canada. The building was constructed in 1963 as the London Gardens, home to the London Knights ice hockey team.  In 1994 it was renamed London Ice House.  In early 2005 it was remodeled into the Forest City Velodrome by local cycling enthusiast and track racer Rob Good and Albert Coulier's Apollo Velodrome Systems company.

It is one of two velodromes in Ontario and one of five indoor cycling facilities in all North America.

The Forest City Velodrome is the shortest permanent velodrome in the world, measuring 138 metres with 50-degree bankings and 17-degree straights.

The Forest City Velodrome runs several programs designed to encourage recreational cycling and develop competitive cyclists.  Learn to ride programs introduce new riders to track cycling.  Organized drills help cyclists hone their skills.  Frequent recreational sessions give riders of various skill levels time to ride on the track for fun, fitness and training.  Periodic race nights develop racing skills and give spectators the chance to learn about and enjoy track cycling events. In 2013, the track hosted the Ontario Provincial Track Championships.

The building that is now called the Forest City Velodrome has gone through many alterations over the years. One of its more famous moments took place in February 1968 when Johnny Cash proposed to June Carter on stage during a performance.

2019 24-Hour Track Attack
In February 2019, Canadian Hour record-holder and former National Team cyclist Ed Veal rode the Forest City Velodrome for 24 hours to set a new Canadian record for distance covered over the period, and to raise money to support upgrades and renovations of the facility. Over $50,000 was raised by the event. Members of the Forest City Velodrome contributed to the event as support riders for Veal during the event.

References

External links
Forest City Velodrome

Sports venues in London, Ontario
Velodromes in Ontario
2005 establishments in Ontario
Sports venues completed in 2005